Shoah (שואה) is the Hebrew term for the Holocaust, used since the 1940s.

Shoah may also refer to:
 Shoah (film), a 1985 documentary about the Holocaust directed by Claude Lanzmann
 Shoah: Four Sisters, a 2017 French documentary film
 USC Shoah Foundation Institute for Visual History and Education, a non-profit organization founded by Steven Spielberg
 Fondation pour la Mémoire de la Shoah, a French organization

See also
 Holocaust (disambiguation)